Waitharli Stadium ( is a football stadium. It is the home stadium of Rakhine United F.C. and is located in Sittwe, Rakhine State, Myanmar.

External links
 Myanmar National League Official Website
 Rakhine United Official Website

Sittwe
Football venues in Myanmar
Buildings and structures in Rakhine State
Sports venues completed in 2017